Individuals and events related to Georgia in 2021.

Incumbents 

 President: Salome Zourabichvili
 Chairperson of the Parliament: Archil Talakvadze
 Prime Minister: Giorgi Gakharia

Establishments

Disestablishments

Events

Ongoing
 COVID-19 pandemic in Georgia (country)

January 

 January 11 – Bidzina Ivanishvili announces he quits politics.
 January 21 – The European Court of Human Rights rules that Russia violated several human rights in the 2008 war with Georgia.

February
February 17 - The Tbilisi City Court sends Nika Melia, the chairman of the opposition United National Movement party, to pre-trial detention after he refused to post bail, being charged with organizing, managing or participating in group violence during the 2019 protests.
February 18 - Prime Minister Giorgi Gakharia resigns, citing disagreement with his party colleagues over enforcing an arrest order for Nika Melia. According to Gakharia, the detention amid the political crisis of the opposition leader threatens further destabilization of the country.
February 22 - Parliament approves Irakli Gharibashvili as the new Prime Minister.
February 23 - Police storms the UNM office, where the opposition leaders and supporters have been gathered following the Court's order, and detains Nika Melia.

March

April
April 19 - Several opposition parties and Georgian Dream sign an agreement, brokered by European Commission President Charles Michel, ending a months-long political deadlock stemming from the 2020 Georgian parliamentary election.
April 21 - President Salome Zurabishvili announced that she would pardon Giorgi Rurua, cofounder of Mtavari Arkhi, on April 27, 2021.

May

June

July
July 5 - Many thousands gather to oppose and obstruct the LGBTQ pride parade. The clashes break out between the media representatives reporting the events live and protesters resulting in 53 journalists being injured. The organizers ultimately cancel the event.
July 28 - The Georgian Dream quits the agreement signed in April with the opposition, citing refusal of the "radical opposition" headed by the United National Movement to join the deal.

August

September

October
October 1 - Former President Mikheil Saakashvili, convicted in absentia on abuse of office charges in 2018 and sentenced to six years in prison, returns to Georgia after an eight-year exile.  The MIA initially claims that Saakashvili had not crossed the country's border but later Prime Minister Irakli Gharibashvili announces in a press briefing that Saakashvili has been arrested. 
October 2 - Local elections. The Georgian Dream party scores up to 47% in the first-round proportional vote, with mayoral races in 20 cities and towns going into runoff.
 October 2 - The Public Defender Nino Lomjaria visits Saakashvili in prison and announces that Saakashvili considers himself a political prisoner and begins a hunger strike.
October 14 - Many ten thousands gather in Freedom Square in the center of Tbilisi demanding the release of Saakashvili.
October 30 - In tense runoff the ruling party wins 19 out of 20 mayoral races.

November
November 23 - Saakashvili ends hunger strike as a compromise with authorities to be transferred to Gori Military Hospital for medical treatment.

December
December 30 - Parliament votes to abolish the State Inspector's Service. Instead, separate agencies will be established to probe abuse of power by law enforcement and for personal data protection, the two functions that were previously joined under the State Inspector.

Deaths

See also
 Outline of Georgia (country)
 Index of Georgia (country)-related articles
 List of Georgia (country)-related topics
 History of Georgia (country)

References

Notes

Citations

Further reading
 
 

 
Georgia
Georgia
2020s in Georgia (country)
Years of the 21st century in Georgia (country)